Mawa is an extinct and unattested language of Nigeria. It was apparently different from a language of Chad also known as Mawa, and so is unclassified.

References

Unattested languages of Africa
Languages of Nigeria